The Ford Mustang GTX was an American GT race car constructed to compete in the GTX category of the IMSA GT Championship series by Ford. Originally based on the second generation Ford Mustang (known as the Mustang II), and later the third generation Ford Mustang (commonly referred to as the "Fox-Body Mustang") road car, built between 1979 and 1983.

References

Grand tourer racing cars
Ford racing cars
Ford Mustang
Rear-wheel-drive vehicles
Zakspeed racing cars